Sculli is a surname. Notable people with the surname include:

Giuseppe Sculli (born 1981), Italian footballer
Luigi Sculli (1921–1959), Italian footballer